The 1996 PPF President's Cup was the 10th edition of Pakistan National Football Challenge Cup. 24 qualified for the tournament but 3 teams withdrew as soon as the tournament started. Quetta hosted the tournament, commencing from August 16, 1996 – September 13, 1996.

Allied Bank won the tournament defeating Pakistan Army 3–1 in the finals, completing the double as they won the league same year.

Teams
A total of 24 teams participated in the team. General Fans won the previous tournament, held in 1994. But they did not participated in the 1996 edition.

Groups

 * Withdrew

Group stage

Group A

Group B

Group C

Group D

Group E

Group F

Group G

Group H

Knockout round
In knockout stages, 2 matches will be played simultaneously therefore one match was played in Quetta while other in Loralai.

Round of 16

Quarter finals

Semi finals

Finals

Statistics

Top goalscorers

References

Football competitions in Pakistan
Pakistan National Football Challenge Cup